Zodarion alentejanum is a spider species found in Portugal.

See also 
 List of Zodariidae species

References

External links 

alentejanum
Spiders of Europe
Fauna of Portugal
Spiders described in 2011